Dubuko is a village in Serbia. It is situated in the Ljubovija municipality, in the Mačva District of Central Serbia. The village had a Serb ethnic majority and a population of 484 in 2002.

Historical population

1948: 738
1953: 758
1961: 680
1971: 566
1981: 474
1991: 417
2002: 484

References

See also
List of places in Serbia

Populated places in Mačva District
Ljubovija